El Dorado Airport  is an airstrip serving the river settlement of El Dorado in the La Paz Department of Bolivia.

See also

Transport in Bolivia
List of airports in Bolivia

References

External links
Bing Maps - El Dorado

Airports in La Paz Department (Bolivia)